Newstead College is a government comprehensive senior secondary school located in , a suburb of , Tasmania, Australia. Established in 1997, the college caters for approximately 500 students in Years 11 and 12. The college is administered by the Tasmanian Department of Education.

In 2023 student enrolments were 400.

History 
The first intake of students to Newstead College was in 1997, However, in late 1996 high school students from around the region were shown through the college while the final work was carried out. During 1997, the College hosted various government figures who toured the College grounds and students attended many ceremonies for the College opening.

Curriculum 
Newstead College offers a broad range of subjects and study options. There is a wide offering of both TASC-approved subjects and VET courses. These include;

TASC-approved
 English
 Health and Physical Education
 Humanities and Social Sciences
 Languages
 Mathematics
 Science
 Technologies
 The Arts

VET
 Furniture Making
 Hairdressing
 Automotive
 Tourism
 Retail
 Business
 Hospitality

The college reduced its VET programs in 2023 loosing VET Construction, and VET IT due to not being able to staff these classes due to lower student numbers. 

The College is well known for its music and drama programs, particularly the Rock Music Summer School which was held on campus for over ten years; that ceased the year after the departure of music director, Roger Francis.

Looking Glass Productions
Looking Glass Productions is Newstead Campus's production company which puts together and performs an annual production of professional quality in August at the Princess Theatre. Newstead now perform smaller productions in their own auditorium.  Looking Glass's Production's include:

Notable alumni 
Todd Hodgetts , an Australian shot put athlete on the autism spectrum
Toby Nankervis, an Australian rules footballer, playing for Richmond Football Club since 2017

See also 
Education in Tasmania
List of schools in Tasmania

References

External links 
 Newstead College website
 Office of Tasmanian Assessment, Standards & Certification

Colleges in Tasmania
Rock Eisteddfod Challenge participants
Educational institutions established in 1996
Educational institutions established in 1997
1996 establishments in Australia
1997 establishments in Australia